Beaked sedge may refer to:

Carex rostrata, (glaucous) beaked sedge or bottle sedge
Carex utriculata, (common) beaked sedge or Northwest Territory sedge